Berks/Dorset/Wilts 3 East was an English Rugby Union league, forming part of the South West Division, for clubs primarily based in Berkshire and Wiltshire.  Promoted teams moved up to Berks/Dorset/Wilts 2 (currently Dorset & Wilts 2 North and Dorset & Wilts 2 South) and there was no relegation.  The league ran for four seasons until 1992 when it merged with Berks/Dorset/Wilts 3 West to form Berks/Dorset/Wilts 3.

Original teams
When this division was introduced in 1988 it contained the following teams from Berkshire, Hampshire and Wiltshire:

Amesbury
Berkshire Shire Hall
Calne
Colerne
Melksham
Tadley
Thatcham

Berks/Dorset/Wilts 3 East honours

Originally known as Berks/Dorset/Wilts 3 East and involved involving clubs based in Berkshire, Dorset and Wiltshire.  It was a tier 10 league with promotion to Berks/Dorset/Wilts 2 and there was no relegation.  At the end of the 1991–92 season Berks/Dorset/Wilts 3 East and counterpart Dorset & Wilts 3 West would merge into a single division known as Berks/Dorset/Wilts 3 (currently Dorset & Wilts 3 North and Dorset & Wilts 3 South).

Number of league titles

Calne (1)
Melksham (1)
Minety (1)
Tadley (1)

Notes

See also
Dorset & Wilts RFU
English Rugby Union Leagues
English rugby union system
Rugby union in England

References

Defunct rugby union leagues in England
Rugby union in Dorset
Rugby union in Wiltshire